William Calverley is a Canadian ice hockey center currently attending the Rochester Institute of Technology. He was an All-American for RIT.

Playing career
Calverley's college career began in 2018 after a solid junior career with the Chilliwack Chiefs. He debuted for RIT as a two-way player and provided depth scoring in his first season. He became one of the team's top goal scorers during his sophomore season and helped the team finish third in Atlantic Hockey. Unfortunately, shortly before their quarterfinal series was to begin, the remainder of the season was cancelled due to the COVID-19 pandemic.

Entering his junior season, Calverley was named an alternate captain. He led the Tigers through a tumultuous season with his best offensive output yet, despite playing 14 fewer games than the previous season. Calverley was named an All-American and co-Atlantic Hockey Player of the Year. For his fourth year with RIT, Calverley was named team-captain.

Career statistics

Regular season and playoffs

Awards and honors

References

External links

1998 births
Living people
Canadian ice hockey centres
Sportspeople from Scarborough, Toronto
Ice hockey people from Toronto
AHCA Division I men's ice hockey All-Americans
Chilliwack Chiefs players
RIT Tigers men's ice hockey players